Cockburn Road is a major road in the southern suburbs of Perth, which connects Fremantle and Kwinana. While it is for the most part a coastal road, much of its length travels through heavy industrial areas. However, a number of other facilities can be found on the road—the Woodman Point Recreation Reserve which includes camping and accommodation facilities, the Beeliar Regional Park and the Cockburn International Raceway.

Main Roads Western Australia controls the section between Rockingham Road and Russell Road, which is designated Highway H25.

Cockburn Road was rerouted around the Henderson Industrial Estate in 2001. In 2008, Cockburn Road was rerouted to bypass around the suburb of Coogee.

The only exits from this road, apart from Russell Road, are minor roads accessing the reserves, industrial estates or the residential suburb of Coogee.

Gallery

See also

References

Roads in Perth, Western Australia
Hamilton Hill, Western Australia